Michele Mirabella  (born 7 July 1943) is an Italian television presenter, University professor and actor.

Biography 
Mirabella graduated in Letters at the University of Bari with a thesis on Luigi Pirandello and received an Honorary Degree in Pharmacy at the University of Ferrara and another in Medicine at the University of Bari. He's also Commendatore Ordine al Merito della Repubblica Italiana.

Show business 
During the University years in Bari, Mirabella began his career as an actor and director of theatrical performances of works by Bertolt Brecht, William Shakespeare, Angelo Beolco, Carlo Goldoni, Samuel Beckett and Georg Buchner. Once he moved to Rome he joined RAI and worked on radio, creating and hosting radio broadcasts. In the early 1980s, Mirabella appeared in several movies, including Massimo Troisi's Ricomincio da tre and Lucio Fulci's The Beyond, where he played the role of librarian Martin Avery.

In 1996 he created the successful TV show Elisir, in transmission on Rai 3 from 1996 to 2017: Elisir was an information television programme dedicated to health and well-being based on clarity and informative simplicity.

Mirabella also curated several cultural programs on Rai Cultura.

Teaching 
Mirabella taught "Sociology of communication: theory and techniques" in the Faculty of Cultural Heritage of the University of Lecce, "Sociology of communication: theory and techniques of mass media" at the University of Bari and has taught at the IULM University of Milan. He has also been the artistic director of the Teatro Traetta in Bitonto and the Teatro Nuovo in Udine.

Personal life 
Mirabella has been married once, but now he's separated from his wife; he has two daughters, Margherita and Marta; he considers himself Roman Catholic.

Partial filmography 
 
Baba Yaga (1973)
Salvo D'Acquisto (1974)
House of Pleasure for Women (1976)
I Hate Blondes (1980)
Ricomincio da tre (1981)
The Beyond (1981)
Grog (1982)
Acqua e sapone (1983)
Thunder Warrior (1983)
Fantozzi subisce ancora (1983)
Vediamoci chiaro (1984)
Demons 2 (1986)
Troppo forte (1986)
Topo Galileo (1988)

References

External links 
 
 

1943 births
Living people
People from Bitonto
Italian television presenters
Academic staff of the IULM University of Milan
University of Bari alumni
Academic staff of the University of Salento
Academic staff of the University of Bari
Italian Roman Catholics
Commanders of the Order of Merit of the Italian Republic